Enterprise output management (EOM) is an information technology practice that deals with the organization, formatting, management and distribution of data that is created by enterprise applications like banking information systems, insurance information systems, ERP (enterprise resource planning systems), CRM (customer relationship management), retail systems and many others.

In 2006, Gartner research estimated the market of EOM solutions at $441 million with 5% growth rate between 2006 and 2010. Gartner defined Distributed output management as middleware that drives the output process and supports the automated creation and delivery of business process and ad hoc documents. Middleware is software that is bridging between different software applications in terms of data formats, languages, communication protocols, etc.

See also 
Enterprise content management
Enterprise information management

References

Enterprise architecture